The anime series xxxHolic and its sequels are based on Clamp's manga series with the same name and were developed by Production I.G. It revolves around Kimihiro Watanuki, a high-school student disturbed by his ability to see the supernatural. He meets Yūko Ichihara, a powerful witch, who owns a wish-granting shop. Watanuki requests to have his ability to see spirits removed and as payment, Yūko hires him to work in the shop, resulting in his encounter with various supernatural adventures.

The first season of anime television series adaptation of xxxHolic began airing on Tokyo Broadcasting System Television on April 6, 2006 in Japan and ended on September 28, 2006, with 24 episodes in total. Both the film and the anime series are directed by Tsutomu Mizushima. Ageha Ohkawa, Clamp's director and main scriptwriter, is executive producer of the TV series. The second season, began airing on TBS on April 3, 2008 in Japan and ended on June 26, 2008, with 13 episodes in total. The main staff and cast remains the same as in the first season. The first season's episodes were also collected in eight DVD volumes published between July 26, 2007 and February 21, 2008, while two DVD boxes were released on August 25, 2010 and October 27, 2010. The second season was released in seven DVD volumes between June 25, 2008 and December 17, 2008, while a second season DVD box was released in Japan only on January 26, 2011.

The first season was licensed by Funimation Entertainment in July 2007. A total of six DVDs were released between March 25, 2008 and October 21, 2008 featuring the first season's episodes, while a DVD box of the first season was released on July 28, 2009. On January 26, 2009, the series made its North American debut on the Funimation Channel.

A two-DVD original video animation (OVA), titled  was also released. The first DVD for this OVA was released on February 17, 2009 with the 14th volume of the Japanese manga. The second one was released alongside volume 15 on June 26, 2009. Another OVA titled  was shipped with the 17th volume of the xxxHolic manga on April 23, 2010. A direct sequel OVA titled  was released on March 9. 2011, and was included with the nineteenth volume from the manga.

Episode list

xxxHolic (2006)

xxxHolic: Kei (2008)

OVA

xxxHolic Shunmuki
The opening theme of episode 1 is "Sofa" by Shikao Suga and the ending theme is "Cherish" by Azu.

xxxHolic Rō

References
General

Specific

XxxHolic
XxxHolic